Redvers Smith (1 December 1903 – after 1932), commonly known as Reg Smith, was an English professional footballer who made 143 Football League appearances playing as a full back for Brighton & Hove Albion.

Life and career
Smith was born in Rotherham, which was then in the West Riding of Yorkshire. He played for Midland League club Scunthorpe & Lindsey United before joining Brighton & Hove Albion in 1923. Although the team had considerable strength at full back during the 1920s, Smith averaged 20 league matches a season for the seven seasons he spent in the first team, and was appointed captain for 1929–30. An injury early in that campaign effectively ended his professional career, although he remained on the club's books until 1931. He then played amateur football for Shoreham.

References

1903 births
Year of death missing
Footballers from Rotherham
English footballers
Association football fullbacks
Scunthorpe United F.C. players
Brighton & Hove Albion F.C. players
Shoreham F.C. players
Midland Football League players
English Football League players